Countess Maria Antonia of Waldstein-Wartenberg (German: Maria Antonie Gräfin von Waldstein zu Wartenberg; 4 March 1771, Vienna – 17 January 1854, Vienna) was a Bohemian noblewoman. By birth, she was a member of the prominent House of Waldstein, maternal grandmother of King Ferdinand II of Portugal and great-grandmother of King Ferdinand I of Bulgaria.

Biography

Born into an old House of Waldstein, Antonia was the fourth child of Count Georg Christian von Waldstein-Wartenberg (1743–1791) and wife, Countess Elisabeth von Ulfeldt (1747–1791), and is the great-granddaughter of the notorious Count Corfitz Ulfeldt. In Vienna on 13 February 1792, Antonia married the Hungarian nobleman Ferenc József, Prince Koháry de Csábrág et Szitnya, a member of the enormously affluent House of Koháry, to whom she bore two children; Ferenc (1792–1795) and Mária Antónia (1797–1862) who married the German Prince Ferdinand of Saxe-Coburg and Gotha and bore four children.

Sources

References

1771 births
1854 deaths
Bohemian nobility